Blue Lantern(s) may refer to:

Uninitiated members of a triad
Blue Lantern (short story collection), a 1991 book by Victor Pelevin
"Blue Lantern" (short story), the title story
Blue Lantern Corps, a fictional organization in DC Comics
The Blue Lantern, a 1918 German silent film

See also
 Blue Light (disambiguation)